Brock Allen Stewart (born October 3, 1991) is an American professional baseball pitcher in the Minnesota Twins organization. He has played in Major League Baseball (MLB) for the Los Angeles Dodgers and Toronto Blue Jays.

Career

Amateur career
Stewart is the son of Jeff Stewart, who is a former college baseball coach and current San Diego Padres scout. Stewart attended Normal Community West High School in Normal, Illinois and was drafted by the New York Mets in the 40th round of the 2010 Major League Baseball Draft. He did not sign and played college baseball at Illinois State University, where he started pitching as a redshirt junior after having primarily been a third baseman before that. In 2013, he played collegiate summer baseball with the Wareham Gatemen of the Cape Cod Baseball League.

Los Angeles Dodgers
Stewart was drafted by the Los Angeles Dodgers in the sixth round of the 2014 Major League Baseball Draft. He made his professional debut with the Ogden Raptors of the Pioneer Baseball League, where he appeared in 17 games (with one start) and was 3–2 with a 3.41 ERA. 

Stewart started the 2015 season with the Great Lakes Loons of the Class-A Midwest League and was promoted after seven starts to the Rancho Cucamonga Quakes of the California League. Between the two levels, he was 4–6 with a 4.46 ERA in 25 appearances (19 starts).

Stewart returned to the Quakes to begin the 2016 season and was promoted to the Tulsa Drillers of the Texas League and Oklahoma City Dodgers of the Pacific Coast League during the season. Despite his promotion he was named to the mid-season Texas League all-star game. He was later named the Dodgers organizational minor league pitcher of the year for 2016. Between three minor league levels in 2016, he was 9–4 with a 1.79 ERA and 129 strikeouts in 21 starts.

Stewart was called up to the majors on June 29, 2016, to start for the Dodgers against the Milwaukee Brewers. He allowed five runs in the second inning and lost the game. He struck out seven and allowed eight hits in his five innings of work. He recorded his first major league win on September 7 against the Arizona Diamondbacks when he allowed only one run in five innings. Stewart made five starts and two relief appearances for the Dodgers with a 5.79 ERA in 28 innings.

Stewart suffered from  tendinitis in his right shoulder during spring training in 2017, causing him to begin the season on the disabled list. After recovering from his injury, Stewart spent 2017 bouncing between the minors and the majors, appearing in 17 games (with 4 starts) for the Dodgers with a 3.41 ERA and no decisions and also making 5 starts for Oklahoma City, where he had a 3.12 ERA. On September 2, he was placed on the 60-day disabled list to make room for Rocky Gale.

Toronto Blue Jays
On July 31, 2019, Stewart was claimed off waivers by the Toronto Blue Jays.  He was called up to the Blue Jays from Buffalo on August 5. Stewart was outrighted off the Blue Jays roster on October 30, 2019.

Chicago Cubs
On December 12, 2019, Stewart was selected by the Chicago Cubs in the minor league phase of the 2019 Rule 5 draft. He was released on May 28, 2020.

Los Angeles Dodgers (second stint)
On December 11, 2020, Stewart signed a minor league contract with the Los Angeles Dodgers organization. However he underwent Tommy John surgery in May and did not pitch in 2021.

Minnesota Twins
On July 14, 2022, Stewart announced that he had signed a two-year minor league contract with the Minnesota Twins.

See also
Rule 5 draft results

References

External links

1991 births
Living people
People from Normal, Illinois
Baseball players from Illinois
Major League Baseball pitchers
Los Angeles Dodgers players
Toronto Blue Jays players
Illinois State Redbirds baseball players
Wareham Gatemen players
Ogden Raptors players
Great Lakes Loons players
Rancho Cucamonga Quakes players
Tulsa Drillers players
Oklahoma City Dodgers players
Buffalo Bisons (minor league) players
Chicago Deep Dish players
Madison Mallards players